The 2019–20 All-Ireland Junior Club Hurling Championship was the 17th staging of the All-Ireland Junior Club Hurling Championship, the Gaelic Athletic Association's junior inter-county club hurling tournament. The championship began on 12 October 2019 and ended on 18 January 2020.

The All-Ireland final was played on 18 January 2020 at Croke Park in Dublin, between Conahy Shamrocks from Kilkenny and Russell Rovers from Cork, in what was their first ever meeting in the final. Conahy Shamrocks won the match by 0-22 to 0-15 to claim their second championship title overall and a first title in 12 years.

Eoghan Rua's Seán Leo McGoldrick was the championship's top scorer with 1-42.

Connacht Junior Club Hurling Championship

Connacht semi-final

Connacht final

Leinster Junior Club Hurling Championship

Leinster first round

Leinster quarter-finals

Leinster semi-finals

Leinster final

Munster Junior Club Hurling Championship

Munster quarter-finals

Munster semi-final

 Russell Rovers received a bye in this round as there were no Clare representatives.

Munster final

Ulster Junior Club Hurling Championship

Ulster quarter-finals

Ulster semi-finals

Ulster final

All-Ireland Junior Club Hurling Championship

All-Ireland quarter-final

All-Ireland semi-finals

All-Ireland final

Championship statistics

Top scorers

Overall

In a single game

References

All-Ireland Junior Club Hurling Championship
All-Ireland Junior Club Hurling Championship
2017